Zbigniew Piórkowski (2 July 1929 – 10 July 1994) was a Polish boxer. He competed in the men's middleweight event at the 1956 Summer Olympics.

References

1929 births
1994 deaths
Polish male boxers
Olympic boxers of Poland
Boxers at the 1956 Summer Olympics
Sportspeople from Łódź
Middleweight boxers